Barbora Štefková (born 4 April 1995) is a retired Czech tennis player.

Štefková reached a career-high singles ranking of world No. 154, on 27 February 2017. On 14 January 2019, she peaked at No. 100 in the doubles rankings. She won nine singles and twelve doubles titles on the ITF Women's Circuit.

Štefková won her biggest title at the 2016 Lale Cup in Istanbul, where she defeated Anastasia Pivovarova in the final.

Her WTA Tour main-draw debut she made at the 2016 Prague Open in the doubles draw alongside Tereza Smitková.
Štefková made her WTA main-draw singles debut at the 2016 Coupe Banque Nationale. She upset defending champion Annika Beck in the first round, before falling to Alison Van Uytvanck.

Due to reactive arthritis, she retired from professional tennis in June 2019.

WTA career finals

Doubles: 1 (runner-up)

WTA 125 tournament finals

Doubles: 2 (2 runner-ups)

ITF Circuit finals

Singles: 13 (9 titles, 4 runner–ups)

Doubles: 17 (12 titles, 5 runner–ups)

Performance timeline

Singles
Only main-draw results in WTA Tour, Grand Slam tournaments and Olympic Games are included in win–loss records.

Notes
 2013: WTA ranking–726,  2014: WTA ranking–441,  2015: WTA ranking–290.

References

External links
 
 

1995 births
Living people
Czech female tennis players
Sportspeople from Olomouc